The 1906 Villanova Wildcats football team represented the Villanova University during the 1906 college football season. Led by third-year head coach Fred Crolius, Villanova compiled a record of 3–7. The team's captain was Charles McGeehan.

Schedule

References

Villanova
Villanova Wildcats football seasons
Villanova Wildcats football